Nikolayevsky is a rural locality (a settlement) in Tarbagataysky District, Republic of Buryatia, Russia. The population was 1,295 as of 2010. There are 26 streets.

Geography 
Nikolayevsky is located 43 km northeast of Tarbagatay (the district's administrative centre) by road. Lesnoy is the nearest rural locality.

References 

Rural localities in Tarbagataysky District